Hazan, Chazan, Chasen, Hasson, and Khazan are all alternative spellings of Hazzan, a Hebrew word carried over into most other Jewish languages that refers to the cantor in the Jewish prayer tradition. The surname was commonly adopted throughout the Jewish diaspora. See also Hassan (surname).

Khazan is a Russian, Ukrainian, and Ashkenazi Jewish surname, and is a variant of the Hebrew 'Hazzan' and means cantor. When spelled Khazan, the name has typically been transliterated from Cyrillic characters (Хазан), suggesting people of Russian-Jewish descent.

Hazan is a Turkish and Romaniote Jewish surname, and is a variant of the Hebrew 'Hazzan' and means cantor. This variant is carried by the Romaniote Jews between Greece and Turkey.

People with the name Hazan include:

Abraham Chazan (1849–1917), Breslover rabbi
Adeline Hazan (born 1965), French politician
Al Hazan, American musician
Alon Hazan (born 1967), Israeli former association footballer, and head coach of the Israel national under-21 football team
Bella Ḥazzan, Bohemian writer
Marcella Hazan (born 1924), Italian writer
Nachman Chazan (1813–1884), Breslover rabbi
Naomi Hazan (born 1946), Israeli politician
Oren Hazan (born 1981), Israeli politician
Samuel Hazan (born 1983), Israeli footballer
Shani Hazan (born 1992), Israeli model, singer, and Miss Israel 2012
Yaakov Hazan (1899–1992), Israeli politician
Yehiel Hazan (born 1958), Israeli politician

See also
Hazan, EMI recording name for Nazia and Zoheb 1980s Pakistan singers, The Hassans

References

Hebrew-language surnames
Jewish surnames